Tyler J. VanderWeele is the John L. Loeb and Frances Lehman Loeb Professor of Epidemiology in the Departments of Epidemiology and Biostatistics at the Harvard T.H. Chan School of Public Health. He is also the co-director of Harvard University's Initiative on Health, Religion and Spirituality, the director of their Human Flourishing Program, and a faculty affiliate of the Harvard Institute for Quantitative Social Science. His research has focused on the application of causal inference to epidemiology, as well as on the relationship between religion and health. He was elected a Fellow of the American Statistical Association in 2014, and received the Mortimer Spiegelman Award from the American Public Health Association in the same year. In 2017, he received the COPSS Presidents' Award from the Committee of Presidents of Statistical Societies.

Research 
VanderWeele conducts research focused on theory and methods for distinguishing between association and causation in the biomedical and social sciences. His contributions to causal inference include introducing the E-value as a quantitative measure for sensitivity analysis and advances in mediation analysis.

Advocacy 
On April 2, 2015, VanderWeele was one of 47 scholars who filed an amicus brief in support of respondents and affirmance in the case of Obergefell v. Hodges, 576 U.S. 644 (2015). The amici curiae argued that there is no Constitutional right to same-sex marriage.

References

External links

Faculty page

Living people
Harvard School of Public Health faculty
American epidemiologists
Alumni of St John's College, Oxford
Wharton School of the University of Pennsylvania alumni
Harvard School of Public Health alumni
Fellows of the American Statistical Association
American statisticians
Year of birth missing (living people)